Chock full o'Nuts is an American brand of coffee that originated from a chain of New York City coffee shops.

Its unusual name derives from the 18 nut shops that founder William Black (c. 1902 – 1983) established under that banner in the city beginning in 1926. When the Great Depression struck, he converted them to lunch counters, serving a cup of coffee and a sandwich for five cents.

In time, the brand grew popular, being introduced to the consumer market through grocery stores starting in 1953. Today, it is owned by coffee giant Massimo Zanetti Beverage Group.

History
The chain was founded by William Black (né Schwartz), who sold nuts in Times Square to theater-goers. In 1926, he opened a store on Broadway and 43rd Street, eventually adding 17 more. When the Depression settled in, New Yorkers could no longer afford the luxury of shelled nuts, so Black converted his shops into lunch counters, selling coffee and sandwiches.

Their signature "nutted cheese" sandwich, made of cream cheese and chopped nuts on dark raisin bread, cost a nickel with a cup of coffee when the company was founded. When coffee prices went up in the 1950s, Black, like other restaurateurs, held to a five cent cup of coffee by watering it down. But he soon broke ranks and raised the price, announcing that he refused to compromise on quality.

In 1953, the coffee brand was introduced to supermarkets. Several years later baseball star Jackie Robinson became the company's vice president and director of personnel, after retiring from the game. (The chain was already known for regularly hiring Black employees in its lunch counters as both cooks and waitstaff.) 

In 1961, Chock full o'Nuts introduced a brand of instant coffee.  Within that decade the chain had approximately 80 restaurants in the New York City area. Hygiene was a selling point, with the sandwiches advertised as "untouched by human hands". Cooks used tongs to assemble them.

In 1974, Chock full o'Nuts purchased Rheingold Brewery. In the 1970s, the lunch counters gradually closed. After Black died, the company sold its remaining 17 restaurants to the restaurant company Riese Bros. In 1988, investor Martin D. Gruss and the companies he controlled purchased a ten percent stake in the Chock full o'Nuts Corporation, saying he might seek control of the company. In 1993, Chock Express stores were introduced.

The Sara Lee Corporation purchased Chock full o'Nuts for $238 million in 1999. In May 2006, it was purchased from Sara Lee by Massimo Zanetti Beverage USA, along with the MJB, Hills Bros., and Chase & Sanborn coffee brands.

On September 10, 2010, the company announced it was returning to the lunch counter business by opening its first store in almost 30 years, on West 23rd Street between Broadway and 6th Avenue in Manhattan. The company said it planned to add stores and kiosks in New York City serving the "nutted cheese" sandwich and other traditional Chock full o'Nuts menu items (plus new choices).
The youngest franchise owner in the years after the comeback was Corey Torjesen of Staten Island, New York, who opened a Chock full o'Nuts franchise, at the age of 19, with money he had  earned from a newspaper route. The 23rd Street store closed in 2012. As of 2019, six stores branded as Chock full o'Nuts Cafés were in operation, including two locations in Brooklyn, and one in each of Elizabeth and Fort Lee, New Jersey; Middletown, New York; and Miami, Florida.

To assure those with allergies to nuts, the company began adding the slogan "NO NUTS! 100% Coffee" to its packaging in the 2000s. (The coffee blend itself has never contained nuts.)

The company also sells their single serve K-Cup variation called "A Better Cup by Design".

Marketing

Jingle

The Chock full o'Nuts advertising jingle was based on the song, "That Heavenly Feeling", written by Bernie Wayne and Bill Silbert. Sung by company founder William Black's wife, cabaret singer Page Morton Black, it received extensive airplay on both radio and television in the 1950s and 1960s. The original lyrics went:

The company was compelled to alter the lyrics from "Rockefeller's money" to "a millionaire's money" after being sued by New York governor Nelson Rockefeller, who owned coffee interests in Latin America. Mid-2000s versions of the jingle replace "millionaire" with "billionaire".

The Bucket List film prop
Chock full o'Nuts coffee cans serve as a plot element in the 2007 film The Bucket List, starring Jack Nicholson, Morgan Freeman and Sean Hayes.

References

External links

 
 The American Package Museum: Chock full o'Nuts Coffee

Coffee brands
Cuisine of New York City
Culture of New York City
Defunct restaurants in New York City
Defunct restaurant chains in the United States
Jackie Robinson
Lunch counters
Massimo Zanetti brands
Sara Lee Corporation brands